Battle of Dytiatyn was one of battles of the Polish–Soviet War of 1919–1921 also referred to as the Polish Thermopylae (together with Battle of Zadwórze and Battle of Wizna). It took place on 16 September 1920 between units of the 8th Polish Field Artillery Regiment from Płock and the 8th Mounted Red Cossack Division of the Red Army near the village of Dytiatyn (now in Ukraine, northwest of Halicz).  Battle is one of Polish Thermopylae.

The 'Red Cossacks' murdered 97 Poles and an additional number of wounded Poles were killed after the battle. Among the dead was the commandant of the regiment Colonel Wladyslaw Domanski. Altogether on that day some 240 Poles died. The 8th Mounted Red Cossack Division of the Red Army was destroyed a few days later near Tarnopol.

In the interbellum period, Polish military authorities established a cemetery and a monument to the massacred soldiers. It was completely destroyed after the Soviet invasion of Poland in September 1939.

External links
 Web service on Battle of Dytiatyn in Polish
 Plock24.pl
 Historycy.pl

Battles of the Polish–Soviet War
September 1920 events
1920 in Ukraine